Overpackaging is the use of excess packaging.  The Institute of Packaging Professionals defines overpackaging as “a condition where the methods and materials used to package an item exceed the requirements for adequate containment, protection, transport, and sale”    

Overpackaging is an opportunity for source reduction, reducing waste before it is generated  by proper package design and practice. Elimination of excess packaging is at the lead of the Reduce, reuse, recycle hierarchy.  Use of minimized packaging is key to having sustainable packaging. Examples of overpackaging can be found in many areas; from e-commerce to retail food packaging.

Some examples of overpackaging are obvious while others are more of a judgement call.   For example, luxury packaging frequently uses more packaging than the minimum requirements. Brand managers believe that premium packaging is needed to communicate the extra value the contents.   Also. gift wrapping can involve excess packaging but traditions and personal choices allow people to continue to use it.  Decorative boxes are an art form which clearly exceed minimum functional requirements.

Excess packaging by design

An example of a wasteful package design is a breakfast cereal box (some other products also). This is typically a folding carton enclosing a plastic bag of cereal. This has a poor material to volume ratio and is very inefficient; it is very wasteful. Package designers  are aware of this opportunity to save packaging costs, materials, and waste but marketing and merchandising people want the “billboard” style package for advertising and graphics. An optimized folding carton would use much less paperboard for the same volume of cereal, but with reduced room for graphics. Use of only a resealable plastic bag would use even less material per unit of cereal; Of course, even that option results with an empty plastic bag to discard.

Underfilled packages
Underfilled or slackfill packaging is that which is intentionally too large for the contents, resulting in non-functional headspace.  This not only risks charges of deceptive packaging but it involves excessive packaging: unnecessary packaging waste.

E-commerce
  
Sometimes a package is properly designed to protect its product for controlled distribution to a retail store;  packaging is minimal.  With online shopping or E-commerce, however, items packed for retail sale need to be shipped individually by the e-tailer or by a fulfillment house.  The individual package is shipped and handled by package delivery or small parcel carriers.  Retail packages are frequently packed into a larger corrugated box for shipment. Often these secondary boxes are much larger than needed, thus use void-fill to immobilize the contents.  This can have the appearance of gross overpackaging. 

If the product manufacturer designed all packaging to meet the requirements of individual  shipment, then the portion delivered to a retail store would have excessive packaging.

With fragile items such as consumer electronics, engineers try to match the fragility of the product with the expected stresses of distribution handling. Package cushioning is used to help ensure safe delivery of the product.  With overpackaging, excessive cushioning and a larger corrugated box are used: wasteful packaging.  

Sometimes two levels of packaging are needed for separate distribution: one for palletize shipment to retail stores and the other designed for individual delivery to households, which results in production inefficiency. New package designs are sometimes called for.

Food overwraps
Fresh produce is usually presented for sale without packages, allowing shoppers to touch the items and choose which ones to buy.  Some foods are over wrapped with shrink film, individually bagged, or further protected to increase the appeal to some customers.  This extra packaging is sometimes considered excessive and unnecessary.

References

 Soroka, W, "Fundamentals of Packaging Technology", IoPP, 2002, 
 Yam, K. L., "Encyclopedia of Packaging Technology", John Wiley & Sons, 2009, 

Packaging